Graball is an unincorporated community in Henry County, Alabama, United States.

Graball has been noted for its unusual place name.

References

Unincorporated communities in Henry County, Alabama
Unincorporated communities in Alabama